The 2011–12 VHL season was the second season of the Higher Hockey League, the second level of ice hockey in Russia. 23 teams participated in the league, and the Toros Neftekamsk won the championship.

Team changes
Krylya Sovetov Moscow ceased activities as a professional hockey team due to financial difficulties.
Sokol Krasnoyarsk and Titan Klin of the lower level First League joined.
Ukrainian HC Donbass became the second non-Russian club in the league.
Lokomotiv Yaroslavl of the Kontinental Hockey League formed a VHL team after losing its senior roster in the 2011 Lokomotiv Yaroslavl plane crash.

Regular season

Western Conference

Eastern Conference

Playoffs

External links
Official website

2011–12 in Russian ice hockey leagues
Rus
Russian Major League seasons